The symbol ₰ can mean:
 a sign for Pfennig, the minor coin of the German Mark
 dele or deleatur, a proof mark